Velić may refer to:

 Surname:
 Ermin Velić (born 1959), former Yugoslav handball player
 Jasminko Velić (21st century), current technical director of Panathinaikos FC
 Location:
 Velić, Croatia, a village near Trilj, Croatia